Tumbler Ridge Secondary School (or TRSS) is a public high school in Tumbler Ridge, British Columbia, Canada. TRSS is operated by School District 59 Peace River South and is the designated secondary school for the town's primary school. TRSS is a participant in the school district's International Student Study Program.

References

External links
 Fraser Institute School Report Card 2010-2011 

High schools in British Columbia
1982 establishments in British Columbia